Beck – Hämndens pris (English: Beck – The Price of Vengeance) is a Swedish police film about Martin Beck, directed by Kjell Sundvall and released in June 2001.

Plot
It is night. A police car pulls over near a van with a flat tire on a desolate highway, where two young men are changing the tire. The police officers step out of the patrol car and offer their help. Suddenly, a third person gets out of the van. One of the officers reacts instantly - this man is a well known criminal, he understands he is recognized. He has also robbed a military camp ten minutes ago, and the van is loaded with explosives and assault rifles. The situation is tense. Later on, the two police officers are found shot dead in a way that looks like an execution. Martin Beck is working on the case and gets all resources he needs to get the unknown murderers. A hunt that gets complicated, because Martin's partner, Gunvald Larsson, was a close friend to one of the killed police officers and he is literally ready to use any methods to find the killer...

Cast 

 Peter Haber as Martin Beck
 Mikael Persbrandt as Gunvald Larsson
 Sophie Tolstoy as Sara Beijer
 Marie Göranzon as Margareta Oberg
 Per Morberg as Joakim Wersén
 Jimmy Endeley as Robban
 Mårten Klingberg as Nick
 Rebecka Hemse as Inger (Martin Beck's daughter)
 Ingvar Hirdwall as Martin Beck's neighbour
 Shanti Roney as Dag Sjöberg
 Matti Berenett as Victor Bengtsson
 Martin Aliaga as Santos Golenza
 Peter Hüttner as Oljelund
 Johan Kustus as Rickard Gudmundsson
 Ingela Olsson as Martina Gudmundsson
 Anders Byström as Leif Gudmunsson
 Fredrik Myrberg as Sten Eriksson
 Bengt Magnusson as himself (news journalist; uncredited)

Reception
The film has been criticized for the similarities with the Murders at Malexander in 1999, but Rolf Börjlind has said that the draft of the film was finished in 1997.

References

External links 

2001 television films
2001 films
Films directed by Kjell Sundvall
Martin Beck films
2000s Swedish-language films
2000s crime films
2000s police procedural films
2000s Swedish films